Donje Novo Selo may refer to the following villages:
Donje Novo Selo, Croatia
Donje Novo Selo (Bujanovac), in Serbia